Kilgarvan is a small village in County Kerry, Ireland. It is situated on the banks of the Roughty River which flows into Kenmare Bay. By car, the village is a ten-minute trip from Kenmare, and thirty minutes from Killarney.

History
Kilgarvan is a village in southeast County Kerry near the Cork boundary. Kilgarvan was the site of the Battle of Callann in 1261 which reduced Norman power in Ireland for almost 300 years. The battle site is located in the townland of Callann (pronounced Collon).

Nearby the town are the ruins of "Ardtully House". This house was built in a castle style by the wealthy landowner Sir Richard John Theodore Orpen (1788-1876), Knight of Ardtully, in 1847. It replaced a number of earlier structures, dating as far back as 1215. It was associated with a number of families including Carew, McCarthy, Dillon, Babbington and Conway. Only ruins remain as it was burned down in 1921 during the Irish War of Independence. Directions on how to find the Castle are painted on the wall of a house on Main Street in Kilgarvan.

Housing development
Kilgarvan has seen property development during recent years, probably to meet housing demand from those seeking an alternative to higher prices in nearby towns. A number of new housing estates were built around the village in recent times.

The population of Kilgarvan decreased from 175 in 1996 to 156 in 2002. 2006 saw an increase to 164. As of the 2016 census, the population was 172.

Kilgarvan has no local industry.

Kilgarvan's sewage treatment plant was constructed in 1936, near the Roughty River. According to the Kerry County Council, the lack of sufficient sewage treatment may represent "a constraint on development in the village" until a new plant is completed. A new sewerage treatment plant was planned for Kilgarvan, with phase one planned to begin in late 2008.

Amenities
Kilgarvan is home to a Coillte Millennium Forest at Rossacroo-na-loo. It is also home to a motor museum with a collection of vintage and classic cars.

Kilgarvan is located between Kenmare and Killarney, and was expected to see the introduction of broadband access during 2009. The roadway through the village forms part of the R569 regional road from Kenmare to Poulgorm Bridge.

Sport
Gaelic games, including Hurling and Gaelic football, are played in Kilgarvan; with Kilgarvan GAA fielding several teams in a season. Kilgarvan retained its intermediate title in 2007 and made history by becoming the first Kerry hurling team to win a Munster Club hurling game at any level in over forty years. Kilgarvan continued in the Munster Junior Club Hurling Championship in 2008 and reached the Munster final becoming the first Kerry hurling team ever to do so. Kilgarvan has its own GAA pitch and facilities including an all weather training track and dressing rooms, extensive drainage work was carried out on the pitch in 2008.

Events
The Annual Kilgarvan Show is held on the Sunday of the August Bank Holiday Weekend. The show has been held in the Fussa Townland since 2007, having previously been held in the local GAA grounds. Recent wet summers in Ireland have seen many shows cancelled and Kilgarvan Show had to be rescheduled in 2007 as a result of the wet weather.

Energy
A number of wind turbines have been built in the Parish of Kilgarvan, all concentrated in the Incheese/top of Coom area close to the County bounds with Cork. Some claim that the turbines have caused disruption to television reception in Kilgarvan. When these turbines are fully completed, Kilgarvan will be home to the largest onshore wind turbine project in Ireland.

People
Michael J. Quill (1905–1966): Was born in Kilgarvan, New York Labour leader, founder of the Transport Workers Union of America. 
Máirín Quill (*1936): Former politician who served as a TD and Senator for the Progressive Democrats is originally from Kilgarvan. 
Sir Richard John Theodore Orpen (1788-1876): Since 1868 Knight of Tully, was one of the principal lessors in the parishes of Kenmare and Kilgravan. In the 1870s his estate amounted to over 12,000 acres in county Kerry as well as 300 acres in county Cork. He built "Ardtully House" in 1847 outside Kilgarvan. Sir Richard Orpen was a grandfather of the famous painter Sir William Orpen, the great uncle of the Irish historian Goddard Henry Orpen and a brother of Dr. Charles Orpen (1791-1856) who founded the "Claremont Institution", the first Institution for the Deaf and Dumb in Ireland at Glasnevin near Dublin.
Healy-Rae: Kilgarvan is the base of the Healy-Rae family, which owns several local businesses. Patriarch Jackie was succeeded as a Teachta Dála by his sons Danny and Michael.

Film

Transport
Bus Éireann operates bus services through Kilgarvan as part of its varied routes. Killarney railway station is the closest rail link to Kilgarvan. The closest airports to Kilgarvan are Kerry Airport which is 30 miles (48 km) away and Cork Airport which is 54 miles (87 km) away. Further away are Shannon Airport which is 104 miles (168 km) away and Dublin Airport which is 204 miles (328 km) away.

Kilgarvan railway station opened on 4 September 1893 and closed on 1 February 1960.

Drunk driving controversy
A motion passed by the Kerry County Council during the winter of 2012-2013 requested that the minister for justice allow the police to "issue permits to people living in rural isolated areas to allow them to drive home from their nearest pub after having two or three drinks on little-used roads driving at very low speeds."

The motion was made by Danny Healy-Rae, a local politician and pub owner. He stated the measure was intended to reverse the decline of rural pub culture and address older residents' isolation.

Wide comment in the media characterised the motion as legalising drunk driving.

See also

List of towns and villages in Ireland

References

Towns and villages in County Kerry